Dominique Monami (born 31 May 1973) is a former tennis player from Belgium. She is her country's first ever top-10 tennis professional.

Monami was born in Verviers. In 1995, she married her coach Bart Van Roost, with whom she has a daughter, and played under the name Dominique Van Roost for much of her career, until their divorce in 2003.

Career
Monami won her first WTA Tour tournament in 1996 in Cardiff (Welsh Open). Before this win, she had been on the ITF circuit where she won seven ITF events, five of which in 1990. In 1997, she reached the quarterfinals of the Australian Open. The following year, Van Roost became the first ever Belgian tennis player (male or female) to reach the top 10 in WTA rankings.

Monami won a total of four WTA singles titles and reached a career-high singles ranking of world No. 9 in October 1998. In total, she participated in 36 Grand Slam tournaments during her career.

Another achievement for Van Roost came during the 2000 Summer Olympics in Sydney where she won the bronze medal in the women's doubles competition, partnering Els Callens. Also in doubles, she reached the quarterfinals of the Australian Open in 1999 and 2000, and the semifinals of the 2000 US Open.

In November 2000, Monami ended her professional tennis career when she became pregnant by Bart Van Roost, whom she divorced later in 2003. Subsequently, in 2006, she married Erik Vink, a manager in Sony BMG.

After retiring from playing, Monami became involved in Belgian tennis in various capacities, including as a tournament director (Brussels Open) and as Fed Cup captain. She also wrote a book titled Een Kwestie van Karakter (Tout est dans le caractère). Monami was awarded Belgian Sports Personality of the Year in 1998.

Since October 2021 is Monami vice-president of the Belgian Olympic Committee.

Significant finals

Olympics

Doubles: 1 (bronze medal)

WTA career finals

Singles: 16 (4 titles, 12 runner-ups)

Doubles: 9 (4 titles, 5 runner-ups)

ITF finals

Singles: 8 (7–1)

Doubles: 2 (1–1)

Singles performance timeline

Head-to-head record

Record vs. top 10 players
 Martina Hingis 1–5
 Venus Williams 1–2
 Serena Williams 1–1
 Kim Clijsters 1–1
 Elena Dementieva 1–0
 Lisa Raymond 1–1
 Mary Pierce 0–5
 Barbara Schett 3–1
 Julie Halard-Decugis 2–2
 Lindsay Davenport 2–1
 Nadia Petrova 1–0
 Jennifer Capriati 0–2
 Monica Seles 0–3
 Amanda Coetzer 4–1

References

External links
 
 
 
 Official website 

1973 births
Living people
People from Verviers
Sportspeople from Liège Province
Belgian female tennis players
Olympic bronze medalists for Belgium
Olympic tennis players of Belgium
Tennis players at the 1996 Summer Olympics
Tennis players at the 2000 Summer Olympics
Olympic medalists in tennis
Hopman Cup competitors
Medalists at the 2000 Summer Olympics